Gnanmangui (also spelled Gnamandji) is a bakwé city in south-western Ivory Coast. It is a sub-prefecture of Méagui Department in Nawa Region, Bas-Sassandra District.

The western third of the sub-prefecture is located in Taï National Park.

Gnanmangui was a commune until March 2012, when it became one of 1126 communes nationwide that were abolished.
 
In 2014, the population of the sub-prefecture of Gnanmangui was 116,476.

Villages
The twenty five villages of the sub-prefecture of Gnanmangui and their population in 2014 are:

Notes

Sub-prefectures of Nawa Region
Former communes of Ivory Coast